Vernaux is a commune in the Ariège department in southwestern France.

Population
Inhabitants of Vernaux are called Vernausiens.

See also
Communes of the Ariège department

References

Communes of Ariège (department)
Ariège communes articles needing translation from French Wikipedia